Cardiorhinus is a genus of click beetles in the subfamily Elaterinae.

Species 
 Cardiorhinus acuminatus Germar, 1824
 Cardiorhinus aeneolipennis Candèze, 1863
 Cardiorhinus andicola Candèze, 1897
 Cardiorhinus antennalis Germar, 1843
 Cardiorhinus apicalis Golbach, 1979
 Cardiorhinus aristatus Golbach, 1979
 Cardiorhinus baeri Fleutiaux, 1940
 Cardiorhinus basalis Candèze, 1863
 Cardiorhinus beckeri Golbach, 1979
 Cardiorhinus bellus Candèze, 1893
 Cardiorhinus bicolor Candèze, 1863
 Cardiorhinus bilineatus Fabricius, 1801
 Cardiorhinus bimaculatus Schwarz, 1902
 Cardiorhinus binotatus Champion, 1896
 Cardiorhinus bonariensis Candèze, 1863
 Cardiorhinus castaneipennis Germar, 1863
 Cardiorhinus chilensis Golbach, 1983
 Cardiorhinus circumcinctus Germar, 1824
 Cardiorhinus collaris Schwarz, 1904
 Cardiorhinus coralinus Golbach, 1983
 Cardiorhinus costae Golbach, 1983
 Cardiorhinus cruentus Candèze, 1863
 Cardiorhinus cuneatus Candèze, 1863
 Cardiorhinus cylindricus Schwarz, 1904
 Cardiorhinus difficilis Golbach, 1988
 Cardiorhinus dimidiatus Schwarz, 1904
 Cardiorhinus discicollis Schwarz, 1906
 Cardiorhinus divaricatus Schwarz, 1904
 Cardiorhinus elegans Golbach, 1983
 Cardiorhinus emarginatus Garg & Vasu, 1998
 Cardiorhinus frenatus Germar, 1824
 Cardiorhinus granulosus Solier, 1851
 Cardiorhinus hayekae Golbach, 1983
 Cardiorhinus humeralis Eschscholtz, 1829
 Cardiorhinus hypocrita Erichson, 1848
 Cardiorhinus inaequalis Candèze, 1863
 Cardiorhinus infernus Schwarz, 1904
 Cardiorhinus intermedius Schwarz, 1904
 Cardiorhinus laetipennis Candèze, 1881
 Cardiorhinus lineatus Golbach, 1979
 Cardiorhinus luisae Golbach, 1983
 Cardiorhinus maculatus Golbach, 1983
 Cardiorhinus maculicollis Candèze, 1863
 Cardiorhinus modestus Candèze, 1863
 Cardiorhinus opacus Candèze, 1863
 Cardiorhinus pallidipennis Candèze, 1863
 Cardiorhinus parabicolor Golbach, 1983
 Cardiorhinus parapullatus Golbach, 1983
 Cardiorhinus piciventris Germar, 1843
 Cardiorhinus pilosus Golbach, 1988
 Cardiorhinus plagiatus Germar, 1824
 Cardiorhinus plagiatus (Germar, 1824)
 Cardiorhinus plebejus Candèze, 1863
 Cardiorhinus politus Fleutiaux, 1940
 Cardiorhinus porteri Golbach, 1983
 Cardiorhinus pullatus Candèze, 1863
 Cardiorhinus quadrivittatus Golbach, 1979
 Cardiorhinus ruficollis Schwarz, 1904
 Cardiorhinus rufilateris (Eschscholtz, 1822)
 Cardiorhinus sanguinolentus Candèze, 1863
 Cardiorhinus schwarzi Golbach, 1983
 Cardiorhinus seminiger Eschscholtz, 1829
 Cardiorhinus semiotoides Fleutiaux, 1940
 Cardiorhinus semirufus Candèze, 1863
 Cardiorhinus simplex Candèze, 1863
 Cardiorhinus sulcatus Candèze, 1863
 Cardiorhinus tactus Candèze, 1881
 Cardiorhinus taeniatus Candèze, 1863
 Cardiorhinus thoracicus Golbach, 1988
 Cardiorhinus trivittatus Candèze, 1863
 Cardiorhinus truncatus Vats & Chauhan, 1993
 Cardiorhinus unicolor Golbach, 1983
 Cardiorhinus vinulus Candèze, 1863
 Cardiorhinus vulneratus Germar, 1824
 Cardiorhinus willineri Golbach, 1979
 Cardiorhinus ypirangus Golbach, 1983

References

External links 
 Cardiorhinus at Biolib
 
 Cardiorhinus at the Interim Register of Marine and Nonmarine Genera

Elateridae genera
Elaterinae
Taxa named by Johann Friedrich von Eschscholtz